The 2003 France rugby union tour of Argentina and New Zealand was a series of matches played in June 2003 in Argentina and New Zealand by France national rugby union team.

Match summary

Match details

References 

 

2003
2003
2003
2003
2003 in New Zealand rugby union
tour
2003 in Argentine rugby union